Political Blind Date is a Canadian television program, which premiered on TVOntario in 2017. The series pairs two Canadian politicians with different ideological beliefs in a "blind date" situation to discuss their perspectives on a political issue; participants are not informed of who they're being paired with until they arrive to begin taping. The participants may already be professionally acquainted with their "date," sometimes even serving in the same political body, but typically do not already know each other very well outside of work, and thus may not previously have had an opportunity to discuss their political perspectives with each other in a non-partisan and non-adversarial way.

The show's fifth season, broadcast in 2022, was its last.

Production

Each episode begins with the two politicians meeting in a neutral space, such as a coffee shop, to begin a basic discussion of their views on the issue, following which each takes the other to tour a facility, business or organization that helps to illuminate their position. For instance, in a Season 1 episode on public transit that paired Doug Ford with Jagmeet Singh, Singh took Ford bicycling to demonstrate how dangerous the activity can be on streets without dedicated bike lanes, while Ford took Singh to Toronto's St. Clair West neighbourhood to illustrate the damage done to the community by the 512 St. Clair streetcar project.

According to the show's producers, the goal is not necessarily to get either politician to change their minds on the issue, so much as to simply allow the participants to understand each other from a more human and less partisan perspective. Several episodes of the series have resulted in the participants continuing to maintain social friendships outside of work; Toronto City Councillors Gary Crawford and Shelley Carroll noted that their Season 3 episode resulted in them learning things about each other's lives, including the commonality that they are both parents to a child with a disability, that they never previously knew even after having served together on council for a full decade.

An episode in the fourth season, airing in 2021, featured the program's first non-Canadian politician, with an episode on clean water featuring former Flint, Michigan mayor Karen Weaver as one of the participants.

The series is produced by Open Door and Nomad Films, and was partially inspired by a similar print feature which ran in The Guardian during the 2017 United Kingdom general election. It also incorporates the participation of the Toronto Star, which publishes background videos on the political issue under discussion before each episode, and followup interviews with the participants about their experience.

The series received a Canadian Screen Award nomination for Best Factual Program or Series at the 7th Canadian Screen Awards in 2019. At the 8th Canadian Screen Awards in 2020, Mark Johnston received a nomination for Best Writing in a Factual Program or Series for the Season 2 episode on indigenous peoples in Canada.

Episodes

Season One (2017)

Season Two (2019)

Season Three (2020)

Season Four (2021)

Season Five (2022)
One fifth-season episode, featuring Monte McNaughton and Jerry Dias discussing trade unionism, was produced and scheduled, but was pulled from broadcast following the breach of trust allegations that were raised against Dias in March. 

The season and the series also closed with a new "date" between the same two politicians, Nathaniel Erskine-Smith and Garnett Genuis, who had appeared together in the show's very first episode.

References

Canadian political television series
TVO original programming
2017 Canadian television series debuts
2010s Canadian documentary television series
2020s Canadian documentary television series
2022 Canadian television series endings